The 1986–87 NBA season was Indiana's 11th season in the NBA and 20th season as a franchise.

Offseason

Draft picks

This table only lists picks through the second round.

Roster

Regular season

Season standings

z - clinched division title
y - clinched division title
x - clinched playoff spot

Record vs. opponents

Game log

Regular season

|- align="center" bgcolor="#ffcccc"
| 1
| October 31, 1986
| @ Philadelphia
| L 104–108
|
|
|
| The Spectrum
| 0–1

|- align="center" bgcolor="#ccffcc"
| 2
| November 1, 1986
| Detroit
| W 92–89
|
|
|
| Market Square Arena
| 1–1
|- align="center" bgcolor="#ccffcc"
| 3
| November 4, 1986
| Philadelphia
| W 125–121 (2OT)
|
|
|
| Market Square Arena
| 2–1
|- align="center" bgcolor="#ffcccc"
| 4
| November 5, 1986
| @ Boston
| L 102–133
|
|
|
| Boston Garden
| 2–2
|- align="center" bgcolor="#ccffcc"
| 5
| November 8, 1986
| San Antonio
| W 130–97
|
|
|
| Market Square Arena
| 3–2
|- align="center" bgcolor="#ffcccc"
| 6
| November 11, 1986
| @ Milwaukee
| L 94–102
|
|
|
| MECCA Arena
| 3–3
|- align="center" bgcolor="#ccffcc"
| 7
| November 13, 1986
| @ New Jersey
| W 120–117
|
|
|
| Brendan Byrne Arena
| 4–3
|- align="center" bgcolor="#ccffcc"
| 8
| November 15, 1986
| Milwaukee
| W 104–103
|
|
|
| Market Square Arena
| 5–3
|- align="center" bgcolor="#ffcccc"
| 9
| November 16, 1986
| @ Washington
| L 111–124
|
|
|
| Capital Centre
| 5–4
|- align="center" bgcolor="#ccffcc"
| 10
| November 18, 1986
| @ L.A. Clippers
| W 98–93
|
|
|
| Los Angeles Memorial Sports Arena
| 6–4
|- align="center" bgcolor="#ffcccc"
| 11
| November 20, 1986
| @ Sacramento
| L 83–92
|
|
|
| ARCO Arena
| 6–5
|- align="center" bgcolor="#ffcccc"
| 12
| November 22, 1986
| @ Seattle
| L 111–121
|
|
|
| Seattle Center Coliseum
| 6–6
|- align="center" bgcolor="#ffcccc"
| 13
| November 23, 1986
| @ Portland
| L 95–108
|
|
|
| Memorial Coliseum
| 6–7
|- align="center" bgcolor="#ffcccc"
| 14
| November 26, 1986
| Houston
| L 88–92
|
|
|
| Market Square Arena
| 6–8
|- align="center" bgcolor="#ccffcc"
| 15
| November 28, 1986
| Denver
| W 126–102
|
|
|
| Market Square Arena
| 7–8
|- align="center" bgcolor="#ffcccc"
| 16
| November 30, 1986
| Portland
| L 101–118
|
|
|
| Market Square Arena
| 7–9

|- align="center" bgcolor="#ffcccc"
| 17
| December 2, 1986
| @ Milwaukee
| L 88–95
|
|
|
| MECCA Arena
| 7–10
|- align="center" bgcolor="#ccffcc"
| 18
| December 3, 1986
| Washington
| W 116–103
|
|
|
| Market Square Arena
| 8–10
|- align="center" bgcolor="#ccffcc"
| 19
| December 5, 1986
| Atlanta
| W 119–113
|
|
|
| Market Square Arena
| 9–10
|- align="center" bgcolor="#ffcccc"
| 20
| December 10, 1986
| @ Philadelphia
| L 112–122
|
|
|
| The Spectrum
| 9–11
|- align="center" bgcolor="#ccffcc"
| 21
| December 11, 1986
| Cleveland
| W 115–94
|
|
|
| Market Square Arena
| 10–11
|- align="center" bgcolor="#ccffcc"
| 22
| December 13, 1986
| New Jersey
| W 95–91
|
|
|
| Market Square Arena
| 11–11
|- align="center" bgcolor="#ffcccc"
| 23
| December 17, 1986
| @ Boston
| L 101–113
|
|
|
| Boston Garden
| 11–12
|- align="center" bgcolor="#ffcccc"
| 24
| December 18, 1986
| Chicago
| L 88–97
|
|
|
| Market Square Arena
| 11–13
|- align="center" bgcolor="#ccffcc"
| 25
| December 20, 1986
| @ New York
| W 123–99
|
|
|
| Madison Square Garden
| 12–13
|- align="center" bgcolor="#ffcccc"
| 26
| December 21, 1986
| @ Cleveland
| L 94–104
|
|
|
| Richfield Coliseum
| 12–14
|- align="center" bgcolor="#ccffcc"
| 27
| December 23, 1986
| Detroit
| W 111–98
|
|
|
| Market Square Arena
| 13–14
|- align="center" bgcolor="#ffcccc"
| 28
| December 27, 1986
| @ Chicago
| L 93–105
|
|
|
| Chicago Stadium
| 13–15
|- align="center" bgcolor="#ccffcc"
| 29
| December 30, 1986
| Cleveland
| W 111–99
|
|
|
| Market Square Arena
| 14–15

|- align="center" bgcolor="#ccffcc"
| 30
| January 2, 1987
| L.A. Clippers
| W 116–106
|
|
|
| Market Square Arena
| 15–15
|- align="center" bgcolor="#ccffcc"
| 31
| January 5, 1987
| @ Dallas
| W 144–135
|
|
|
| Reunion Arena
| 15–16
|- align="center" bgcolor="#ccffcc"
| 32
| January 6, 1987
| @ San Antonio
| W 101–99
|
|
|
| HemisFair Arena
| 16–16
|- align="center" bgcolor="#ffcccc"
| 33
| January 8, 1987
| @ Houston
| L 96–110
|
|
|
| The Summit
| 17–16
|- align="center" bgcolor="#ffcccc"
| 34
| January 10, 1987
| @ Utah
| L 96–105
|
|
|
| Salt Palace
| 17–17
|- align="center" bgcolor="#ffcccc"
| 35
| January 13, 1987
| Philadelphia
| L 94–101
|
|
|
| Market Square Arena
| 17–18
|- align="center" bgcolor="#ccffcc"
| 36
| January 15, 1987
| Washington
| W 113–105
|
|
|
| Market Square Arena
| 18–18
|- align="center" bgcolor="#ccffcc"
| 37
| January 17, 1987
| Dallas
| W 119–115 (2OT)
|
|
|
| Market Square Arena
| 19–18
|- align="center" bgcolor="#ccffcc"
| 38
| January 19, 1987
| Chicago
| W 109–95
|
|
|
| Market Square Arena
| 20–18
|- align="center" bgcolor="#ffcccc"
| 39
| January 21, 1987
| @ Boston
| L 100–130
|
|
|
| Boston Garden
| 20–19
|- align="center" bgcolor="#ffcccc"
| 40
| January 22, 1987
| L.A. Lakers
| L 108–118
|
|
|
| Market Square Arena
| 20–20
|- align="center" bgcolor="#ffcccc"
| 41
| January 24, 1987
| Phoenix
| L 103–104
|
|
|
| Market Square Arena
| 20–21
|- align="center" bgcolor="#ffcccc"
| 42
| January 27, 1987
| @ Atlanta
| L 98–114
|
|
|
| The Omni
| 20–22
|- align="center" bgcolor="#ffcccc"
| 43
| January 30, 1987
| Boston
| L 94–100
|
|
|
| Market Square Arena
| 20–23
|- align="center" bgcolor="#ffcccc"
| 44
| January 31, 1987
| @ Cleveland
| L 100–102
|
|
|
| Richfield Coliseum
| 20–24

|- align="center" bgcolor="#ffcccc"
| 45
| February 3, 1987
| Philadelphia
| L 94–99
|
|
|
| Market Square Arena
| 20–25
|- align="center" bgcolor="#ccffcc"
| 46
| February 5, 1987
| @ Detroit
| W 98–93
|
|
|
| Pontiac Silverdome
| 21–25
|- align="center"
|colspan="9" bgcolor="#bbcaff"|All-Star Break
|- style="background:#cfc;"
|- bgcolor="#bbffbb"
|- align="center" bgcolor="#ccffcc"
| 47
| February 10, 1987
| @ Golden State
| W 126–125 (OT)
|
|
|
| Oakland-Alameda County Coliseum Arena
| 22–25
|- align="center" bgcolor="#ccffcc"
| 48
| February 11, 1987
| @ Phoenix
| W 121–105
|
|
|
| Arizona Veterans Memorial Coliseum
| 23–25
|- align="center" bgcolor="#ffcccc"
| 49
| February 13, 1987
| @ L.A. Lakers
| L 108–113
|
|
|
| The Forum
| 23–26
|- align="center" bgcolor="#ffcccc"
| 50
| February 14, 1987
| @ Denver
| L 113–129
|
|
|
| McNichols Sports Arena
| 23–27
|- align="center" bgcolor="#ccffcc"
| 51
| February 16, 1987
| Golden State
| W 112–93
|
|
|
| Market Square Arena
| 24–27
|- align="center" bgcolor="#ccffcc"
| 52
| February 18, 1987
| Seattle
| W 105–88
|
|
|
| Market Square Arena
| 25–27
|- align="center" bgcolor="#ccffcc"
| 53
| February 20, 1987
| @ Atlanta
| W 107–105
|
|
|
| The Omni
| 26–27
|- align="center" bgcolor="#ccffcc"
| 54
| February 22, 1987
| Sacramento
| W 103–101
|
|
|
| Market Square Arena
| 27–27
|- align="center" bgcolor="#ffcccc"
| 55
| February 24, 1987
| @ Milwaukee
| L 114–120 (2OT)
|
|
|
| MECCA Arena
| 27–28
|- align="center" bgcolor="#ffcccc"
| 56
| February 26, 1987
| @ Washington
| L 94–100
|
|
|
| Capital Centre
| 27–29
|- align="center" bgcolor="#ffcccc"
| 57
| February 27, 1987
| @ New Jersey
| L 115–125
|
|
|
| Brendan Byrne Arena
| 27–30

|- align="center" bgcolor="#ccffcc"
| 58
| March 1, 1987
| New York
| W 122–115 (OT)
|
|
|
| Market Square Arena
| 28–30
|- align="center" bgcolor="#ffcccc"
| 59
| March 3, 1987
| Atlanta
| L 108–109
|
|
|
| Market Square Arena
| 28–31
|- align="center" bgcolor="#ffcccc"
| 60
| March 7, 1987
| Milwaukee
| L 120–124
|
|
|
| Market Square Arena
| 28–32
|- align="center" bgcolor="#ccffcc"
| 61
| March 9, 1987
| Utah
| W 107–102
|
|
|
| Market Square Arena
| 29–32
|- align="center" bgcolor="#ffcccc"
| 62
| March 11, 1987
| Detroit
| L 98–107
|
|
|
| Market Square Arena
| 29–33
|- align="center" bgcolor="#ccffcc"
| 63
| March 13, 1987
| Boston
| W 116–109
|
|
|
| Market Square Arena
| 30–33
|- align="center" bgcolor="#ccffcc"
| 64
| March 15, 1987
| New Jersey
| W 123–99
|
|
|
| Market Square Arena
| 31–33
|- align="center" bgcolor="#ffcccc"
| 65
| March 16, 1987
| @ Detroit
| L 95–115
|
|
|
| Pontiac Silverdome
| 31–34
|- align="center" bgcolor="#ffcccc"
| 66
| March 19, 1987
| @ New York
| L 105–111 (OT)
|
|
|
| Madison Square Garden
| 31–35
|- align="center" bgcolor="#ccffcc"
| 67
| March 21, 1987
| Cleveland
| W 77–76
|
|
|
| Market Square Arena
| 32–35
|- align="center" bgcolor="#ccffcc"
| 68
| March 23, 1987
| Washington
| W 101–92
|
|
|
| Market Square Arena
| 33–35
|- align="center" bgcolor="#ccffcc"
| 69
| March 25, 1987
| Milwaukee
| W 125–108
|
|
|
| Market Square Arena
| 34–35
|- align="center" bgcolor="#ccffcc"
| 70
| March 27, 1987
| New York
| W 100–91
|
|
|
| Market Square Arena
| 35–35
|- align="center" bgcolor="#ccffcc"
| 71
| March 28, 1987
| @ Atlanta
| W 120–114
|
|
|
| The Omni
| 36–35

|- align="center" bgcolor="#ccffcc"
| 72
| April 1, 1987
| Chicago
| W 99–94
|
|
|
| Market Square Arena
| 37–35
|- align="center" bgcolor="#ffcccc"
| 73
| April 2, 1987
| @ Detroit
| L 73–119
|
|
|
| Pontiac Silverdome
| 37–36
|- align="center" bgcolor="#ffcccc"
| 74
| April 4, 1987
| @ New York
| L 108–112
|
|
|
| Madison Square Garden
| 37–37
|- align="center" bgcolor="#ccffcc"
| 75
| April 7, 1987
| New Jersey
| W 128–114
|
|
|
| Market Square Arena
| 38–37
|- align="center" bgcolor="#ffcccc"
| 76
| April 9, 1987
| @ Cleveland
| L 99–111
|
|
|
| Richfield Coliseum
| 38–38
|- align="center" bgcolor="#ccffcc"
| 77
| April 10, 1987
| @ Washington
| W 115–101
|
|
|
| Capital Centre
| 39–38
|- align="center" bgcolor="#ffcccc"
| 78
| April 12, 1987
| @ Chicago
| L 95–116
|
|
|
| Chicago Stadium
| 39–39
|- align="center" bgcolor="#ffcccc"
| 79
| April 13, 1987
| Atlanta
| L 101–102
|
|
|
| Market Square Arena
| 39–40
|- align="center" bgcolor="#ffcccc"
| 80
| April 15, 1987
| Boston
| L 85–108
|
|
|
| Market Square Arena
| 39–41
|- align="center" bgcolor="#ccffcc"
| 81
| April 17, 1987
| @ Philadelphia
| W 115–111
|
|
|
| The Spectrum
| 40–41
|- align="center" bgcolor="#ccffcc"
| 82
| April 18, 1987
| @ New Jersey
| W 112–103
|
|
|
| Brendan Byrne Arena
| 41–41

Playoffs

|- align="center" bgcolor="#ffcccc"
| 1
| April 24, 1987
| @ Atlanta
| L 94–110
| Steve Stipanovich (22)
| Steve Stipanovich (13)
| Vern Fleming (6)
| The Omni16,522
| 0–1
|- align="center" bgcolor="#ffcccc"
| 2
| April 26, 1987
| @ Atlanta
| L 93–94
| Chuck Person (24)
| Herb Williams (8)
| Williams, Fleming (4)
| The Omni16,522
| 0–2
|- align="center" bgcolor="#ccffcc"
| 3
| April 29, 1987
| Atlanta
| W 96–87
| Chuck Person (23)
| Chuck Person (17)
| Chuck Person (7)
| Market Square Arena12,303
| 1–2
|- align="center" bgcolor="#ffcccc"
| 4
| May 1, 1987
| Atlanta
| L 97–101
| Chuck Person (40)
| Vern Fleming (11)
| Vern Fleming (8)
| Market Square Arena14,039
| 1–3
|-

Player statistics

Season

Playoffs

Player Statistics Citation:

Awards and records
 Chuck Person, NBA Rookie of the Year Award
 Chuck Person, NBA All-Rookie Team 1st Team

Transactions

References

See also
 1986-87 NBA season

Indiana Pacers seasons
Indiana
Indiana
Indiana